Dhour Ngor Chol (born 13 June 1993) is a South Sudanese footballer who is last known to have played as a midfielder for Stirling Lions.

Career

In 2015, Chol signed for German fifth division side Inter Leipzig but left due to homesickness.

In 2017, he signed for Moreland Zebras in the Australian second division 

Before the 2019 season, he signed for Australian third division club Stirling Lions.

References

External links

 

Living people
Australian expatriate sportspeople in Germany
Expatriate footballers in Germany
Australian people of South Sudanese descent
Sportspeople of South Sudanese descent
People with acquired South Sudanese citizenship
South Sudanese footballers
South Sudan international footballers
1993 births
Inglewood United FC players
Moreland Zebras FC players
Inter Leipzig players
Association football midfielders
South Sudanese expatriate footballers
Stirling Macedonia FC players
Soccer players from Perth, Western Australia